Miroslav Hanuš (born 22 May 1963) is a Czech actor.

Selected filmography

Film
 ROMing (2007)
 Innocence (2011)
 We Are Never Alone (2016)
 Po strništi bos (2017)
 Domestik (2018)
 Charlatan (2020)
 Havel (2020)
 Droneman (2020)

Television
 Ulice (2005)
 Případy 1. oddělení (2014)
 Iveta (2022)
 Stíny v mlze (2022)
 Podezření (2022)

References

External links
 

1963 births
Living people
Male actors from Prague
Czech male film actors
Czech male stage actors
Academy of Performing Arts in Prague alumni
Czech male television actors
21st-century Czech male actors
20th-century Czech male actors